Zavader-e Olya (also Romanized as Zavāder-e ‘Olyā; also known as Zavāder) is a village in Bala Jam Rural District, Nasrabad District, Torbat-e Jam County, Razavi Khorasan Province, Iran. At the 2006 census, its population was 93, in 22 families.

References 

Populated places in Torbat-e Jam County